Ejiro Evero (born January 6, 1981) is an American football coach who is the defensive coordinator for the Carolina Panthers of the National Football League (NFL). He previously served as an assistant coach for the Denver Broncos, Los Angeles Rams, Green Bay Packers, Tampa Bay Buccaneers, San Francisco 49ers.

Early life
Evero was born in Colchester, England, but grew up in Rancho Cucamonga, California, and attended Alta Loma High School.

Playing career
Evero played college football at UC Davis as a safety and was signed by the Oakland Raiders as an undrafted free agent in 2004.

Coaching career

Tampa Bay Buccaneers
Evero got his first NFL coaching opportunity with the Tampa Bay Buccaneers in 2007, where he worked as a defensive quality control coach until 2009.

San Francisco 49ers
After leaving the Tampa Bay Buccaneers in 2009 and spending the 2010 season with the University of Redlands, Evero got back into the NFL in 2011 with the San Francisco 49ers, where he worked as a quality control coach in 2011, an offensive assistant from 2012-2013 and a defensive assistant from 2014-2015.

Green Bay Packers
Evero seved as a defensive quality control coach during the 2016 season with the Green Bay Packers.

Los Angeles Rams
Evero served as the safeties coach for the  Los Angeles Rams from 2017-2020. For the 2021-2022 season Evero had his role changed to secondary coach & passing game coordinator, Evero helped the Rams win a Superbowl during the 2021-2022 season.

Denver Broncos
On February 18, 2022, Evero was hired by the Denver Broncos to serve as the team's defensive coordinator for the 2022 season. After Nathaniel Hackett was fired as the Broncos' head coach, Evero was offered the interim job. He decided to pass on the interim position and remain the defensive coordinator. On February 4, 2023, five days after the Denver Broncos traded for Sean Payton to be their head coach, Evero was released from his contract making him a free agent.

Carolina Panthers
On February 5, 2023, Evero was hired by the Carolina Panthers as their defensive coordinator under head coach Frank Reich.

References

External links
 Carolina Panthers profile
  Los Angeles Rams profile

1981 births
Living people
21st-century African-American sportspeople
20th-century African-American people
African-American coaches of American football
African-American players of American football
Carolina Panthers coaches
Coaches of American football from California
Denver Broncos coaches
English emigrants to the United States
Los Angeles Rams coaches
National Football League defensive coordinators
Oakland Raiders players
People from Rancho Cucamonga, California
Players of American football from California
Sportspeople from Colchester